Tazrouk (Arabic: تازروك or تاظروك) is a town and commune, and district seat of Tazrouk District in Tamanrasset Province, Algeria. According to the 2008 census it has a population of 4,208, up from 3,033 in 1998, with an annual growth rate of 3.1%. Its postal code is 11140 and its municipal code is 1106.

Geography

Most of the town is located on the east bank of a wadi that runs past the town from the northwest to the southeast.

Climate

Tazrouk has a hot desert climate (Köppen climate classification BWh), with hot summers and cool winters, and little precipitation throughout the year. The climate is quite moderate compared to much of the rest of the Sahara due to the high altitude, and precipitation, while still low, is somewhat more frequent.

Transportation

Tazrouk is connected to the N55 highway near Idlès by a local road leading to the north.

Education

3.0% of the population has a tertiary education, and another 12.1% has completed secondary education. The overall literacy rate is 82.2%, and is 91.1% among males and 72.4% among females.

Localities
The commune is composed of nine localities:

Tazrouk
In Ezzane
Serkout
Tin Tarabine
Col d'Azrou portion Nord
Tassili Alaksad Partie Sud
Région de Ahnat
Tazoulet
Akal Gazoulène

References

Neighbouring towns and cities

Communes of Tamanrasset Province
Tuareg
Cities in Algeria
Algeria